The Chaplain of San Lorenzo is a 1953 West German drama film directed by Gustav Ucicky and starring Willy Birgel, Dieter Borsche and Gertrud Kückelmann. It was shot at the Bavaria Studios in Munich. The film's sets were designed by the art directors Robert Herlth and Gottfried Will.

Cast

References

External links

1953 drama films
German drama films
West German films
Films directed by Gustav Ucicky
Bavaria Film films
Films shot at Bavaria Studios
German black-and-white films
1950s German films